SIG Sauer of Newington, NH United States manufactures a full line of 1911 styled handguns.  The earliest models were very faithful to the John M. Browning designed Colt M1911 Pistol which became the United States standard sidearm and served in that capacity for some seven decades before being replaced by the Beretta M9 handgun.

Full size models

 1911 Emperor Scorpion Full-Size
 1911 Fastback Nightmare Full-Size
 1911 Match Elite Stainless Full-Size
 1911 Max Full-Size
 1911 Nickel Rail Full-Size
 1911 Spartan Full-Size
 1911 Stainless
 1911 Stainless Super Target Full-Size
 1911 STX Full-Size
 1911 TACOPS Full-Size  Picatinny Rail, 9 x 19mm Parabellum, 10mm S&W, .45 ACP
 1911 Target Full-Size
 1911 We The People Full-Size
 1911 XO Full-Size
 1911 TSS CAB13  duo-tone stainless and black, factory installed Crimson Trace  laser burlwood grips

Design differences

Historical context
Due to the poor performance of the .38 Long Colt revolvers used in the Philippines during and after the Spanish–American War the US Army sought a new handgun to be chambered in a larger caliber.  Tests began in 1907 and culminated in a design from John M. Browning created for the Colt Patent Firearms Manufacturing Co. designated Model 1910, but with changes made to that design.  It was type accepted as the Government Model M1911.

Early models

The SIG Sauer GSR ("Granite Series Rail") is a series of pistols with a stainless steel frame and slide based on the Colt M1911 Pistol. The SIG Granite Series was awarded the 2004 Handgun of the Year Award by the Shooting Industry Academy of Excellence. It is entirely made in the USA, from American parts.

Description:
Chambered for the .45 ACP round, some GSR models have an accessory rail that can be used to mount a variety of different tactical lights, lasers, or just about anything that can accommodate a Picatinny rail. Standard models have a 5" barrel and 4.5-pound single-action trigger. The GSR is reported to have produced range results of a 1.5" group at 25 meters. The GSR comes in compact (3.5" barrel) and carry models (4" barrel) and has various sight options available.
SIG offers choice of a stainless steel finish, a Nitron dark finish, or a two-tone Nitron and stainless look.

The TAC OPS and Scorpion versions feature a Picatinny rail, night sights, and a threaded barrel to allow the user to attach a sound suppressor.

Users

 
 Public Security Police
 Republican National Guard
 
 Boston Police Department SWAT
 
 Policía metropolitana DOEM

References

External links 

 SIG Sauer Catalog
 SIG Sauer 1911 Handguns (Website)

.45 ACP semi-automatic pistols
1911 platform
SIG Sauer semi-automatic pistols
Semi-automatic pistols of the United States